Paalam may refer to:

Films
Paalam (1983 film), 1983 Indian Malayalam film
Paalam (1990 film), 1990 Indian Tamil film
Walang Hanggang Paalam, a Philippine crime drama television series

Other uses
Carlo Paalam (born 1998), a Filipino boxer
Palam, a suburb and residential colony in South West Delhi
Palam metro station, metro station of the Delhi Metro